The Cedars in Franklin, Kentucky, located at 812 E. Cedar St., in Franklin, in Simpson County, is a historic house built in 1836.  It was listed on the National Register of Historic Places in 1996.

The main building is the two-story Greek Revival house, built in 1836.  This "features minimal wood detailing, typical of this early style and period of construction."

See also
The Cedars (Leitchfield, Kentucky), in Grayson County, also NRHP-listed

References

National Register of Historic Places in Simpson County, Kentucky
Greek Revival architecture in Kentucky
Houses completed in 1836
1836 establishments in Kentucky
Houses on the National Register of Historic Places in Kentucky
Houses in Simpson County, Kentucky
Franklin, Kentucky